This is a list of the National Register of Historic Places listings in Lake Clark National Park and Preserve.

This is intended to be a complete list of the properties and districts on the National Register of Historic Places in Lake Clark National Park and Preserve, Alaska, United States.  The locations of National Register properties and districts for which the latitude and longitude coordinates are included below, may be seen in a Google map.

There are 9 properties and districts listed on the National Register in the preserve, one of which is a National Historic Landmark.

Current listings 

|}

See also 
 National Register of Historic Places listings in Lake and Peninsula Borough, Alaska
 List of National Historic Landmarks in Alaska
 National Register of Historic Places listings in Alaska

References

Lake Clark